Pearl Forrester is a fictional character on Mystery Science Theater 3000, and is played by Mary Jo Pehl. Pearl is the mother of Dr. Clayton Forrester (Trace Beaulieu). Initially devised as a guest character, Pearl became a supporting character for Clayton before replacing him as the lead mad scientist.

Character
Pearl first appears in episode 607, "Bloodlust!". Her character appears in the opening and closing host segments when she pays a visit to Clayton and TV's Frank; she has had a long-running correspondence with the character Frank but ignores her son's attempts to make her proud, often emotionally (and sometimes physically) abusing him. At the end of the sixth season, Frank ascends to "Second Banana Heaven" and Pearl moves in to help Clayton at the beginning of the seventh season and becomes a regular cast member for the rest of the series' original run.

Pearl takes over as the head mad scientist at the beginning of the eighth season. According to the backstory presented at that time, Pearl claims that she has killed Clayton (who devolved into a "star child" at the end of "Laserblast", then vows to "avenge his death" by continuing experimenting on Mike Nelson and the Bots; she cryogenically freezes herself until 2525 and becomes the leader of the Planet of the Apes-like apes who now dominate Earth, at which point she draws the Satellite of Loves crew back to the ship to send them bad movies. In the episode "The Deadly Mantis", the Earth is destroyed when Professor Bobo and Dr. Peanut help their mutant neighbors fix their thermonuclear device. Until the series finale, she is assisted by Professor Bobo, who often addresses her as "Lawgiver"  and Observer. In the episode "Quest of the Delta Knights", frustrated with the lack of progress in the experiment, she decides to do some role reversal to determine the problem. She switches places with Mike. During the movie, instead of smoking, she sucks on a mint and shares it with the Bots, who later referred to her as "Mintgiver".

When the SOL returns to the present day, Pearl and her lackeys take residence at Castle Forrester, where she finds records of a long line of Forresters who had performed experiments similar to those she and Clayton conducted on Mike and the Bots. Pearl claims to be descended from these Forresters. She has been married several times, with every husband meeting a gruesome fate on their honeymoons.

At the end of the series, Pearl accidentally uses a new controller to send the Satellite of Love crashing back to Earth. She supposedly becomes the ruler of Qatar, where she vows that her first item of business would be to insert a "U" in the nation's name. In the original series finale, she is last seen with her lair devoid of furnishings, attempting to dance and sing "It's a Long Way to Tipperary" with her cronies. Her last words to Mike and the Bots before pulling the plug on Castle Forrester's observation equipment are: "Look, Nelson. Move on. I am."

During the Netflix revival, she appears in the first episode, "Reptilicus", alongside Bobo and Observer, deliberately trying to avoid her granddaughter Kinga, who has begun similar experiments on a Gizmonic employee, then again at Kinga's botched wedding to Jonah. She returns in season 13, speaking to Kinga.

External links

Mystery Science Theater 3000 characters
Fictional mad scientists
Female characters in television
Television characters introduced in 1994